Vellayan Chettiyar Higher Secondary School is a state board higher secondary school run by the AMM Foundation. It is located in Thiruvottiyur, Chennai, India.

Each year students enter higher education institutions such as the Anna University,  Medical colleges in Tamil Nadu, Dental and other top engineering colleges in Tamil Nadu. The school was taken over in 1963 by AMM foundation and named after AMM Vellayan Chettiyar. The school is affiliated to Tamil Nadu State Board for classes from 6th to 12th standard.

External links
Facebook Fan Page

High schools and secondary schools in Chennai
Education in Tiruvallur district